Kim Raver (born March 15, 1969) is an American actress and producer. She is best known for television roles such as Dr. Teddy Altman on ABC's medical drama Grey's Anatomy, Kim Zambrano on Third Watch, and Audrey Raines on 24.

Early life 
Kimberly Jayne Raver was born and raised in New York City by her mother. She attended Boston University, where she received a Bachelor of Fine Arts degree in drama. She is fluent in French and German, a language that she learned as a child from her German-born mother.

Career 
Raver got her start as a child star in 1975 appearing on Sesame Street at age 6. She remained on the show for three years. She initially acted in commercials for Visa and Jeep when her adult career began. Her first prominent role was her Broadway debut in 1995 in the Philip Barry play "Holiday" in which she co-starred with Laura Linney and Tony Goldwyn. She also appeared in the feature film City Hall with Al Pacino. She also co-starred with  John Spencer and David Schwimmer in "The Glimmer Brothers", a production of the Williamstown Theatre Festival, written by Warren Leight. After her time on Third Watch, she was cast as Audrey Raines in the popular television series 24, and was a series regular for two seasons.

During the Fall 2006 television season, Raver starred in the ABC television series The Nine. Although the show received outstanding critical reviews, it did not take off in the Nielsen ratings, and was therefore cancelled. She reprised her role in 24'''s season 6 as Audrey Raines. The character was in a catatonic state at the end of the season.

Raver starred as Nico Reilly, the editor-in-chief of Bonfire magazine, in NBC's television drama series Lipstick Jungle. The show was adapted from the Candace Bushnell novel and ran for 20 episodes from February 2008-January 2009.

Raver joined Season 6 of Grey's Anatomy in a recurring role as Dr. Teddy Altman, a cardiothoracic surgeon brought in by Dr. Owen Hunt, who served with her in Iraq. She made her on-screen debut on November 12. It was announced on January 4, 2010, that Raver had become a series regular on the show. On May 18, 2012, Grey's Anatomy creator, Shonda Rhimes, announced that Raver had decided to leave Grey's Anatomy after three seasons, "I know this season's finale had some surprises for viewers and the exit of Kim Raver was one of the big ones. But Kim's series option was up and she was ready to give Teddy Altman a much-needed vacation. It's been a pleasure working with someone as talented and funny and kind as Kim; everyone is going to miss her terribly. I like to imagine that Teddy is still out there in the Grey's Anatomy universe, running Army Medical Command and building a new life." When the news of her departure was released, Raver wrote on her Twitter, "I've had one of the best times of my creative career working on Grey's with Shonda, Betsy and the best cast on Television," she wrote, adding: "I feel fortunate and grateful to have worked with such an amazing team at GA [Grey's Anatomy]. [I] am going to miss everyone!! And to the GA [Grey's Anatomy] fans, you guys rock! I am sure S9 [season nine] will be great!

In 2014, Raver returned to the role of Audrey Boudreau (née Raines) for the twelve-episode 24: Live Another Day. In 2015, she had a guest-appearance on the eleventh-season premiere of Bones.

In 2017, Raver recurred on the fifth season of Ray Donovan and also returned as Dr. Teddy Altman on Grey's Anatomy for its 14th season. In the same year, Raver was cast in the recurring role of Dr. Andrea Frost on the second season of the ABC political drama Designated Survivor. In May 2018, it was announced that she would once again become a series regular on Grey's Anatomy'', beginning with its 15th season.

Raver continues to study theater in New York with teacher and mentor Wynn Handman.

Personal life 
Raver has been married to director and writer Manuel Boyer since 2000. They have two sons.

Filmography

Film

Television

References

External links 

1969 births
Actresses from New York City
American child actresses
American film actresses
American people of German descent
American television actresses
Boston University College of Fine Arts alumni
Living people
20th-century American actresses
21st-century American actresses
Northfield Mount Hermon School alumni